Aptunga is a genus of snout moths. It was described by Carl Heinrich in 1956.

Species
Aptunga culmenicola Neunzig, 1996
Aptunga macropasa (Dyar, 1919)
Aptunga setadebilia Neunzig, 1996
Aptunga vega Neunzig, 1996

References

Phycitinae
Pyralidae genera
Taxa named by Carl Heinrich